Sándor Bognár (born 15 November 1950) is a Hungarian equestrian. He competed in the team jumping event at the 1972 Summer Olympics.

References

1950 births
Living people
Hungarian male equestrians
Olympic equestrians of Hungary
Equestrians at the 1972 Summer Olympics
Sportspeople from Budapest